David Anthony Pullan (1 May 1944 – 6 October 2022) was an English first-class cricketer who played for Nottinghamshire as a wicket-keeper from 1970 to 1974.

References

External links
 
 David Pullan at Nottinghamshire County Cricket Club

1944 births
2022 deaths
Nottinghamshire cricketers
Cricketers from Leeds